The O(n) scheduler is the scheduler used in the  Linux kernel between versions 2.4 and 2.6. Since version 2.6.0, it has been replaced by the O(1) scheduler and in 2.6.23 by the current Completely Fair Scheduler (CFS).

Algorithm 
This scheduler divides processor time into epochs. Within each epoch, every task can execute up to its time slice. If a task does not use all of its time slice, then the scheduler adds half of the remaining time slice to allow it to execute longer in the next epoch.

Advantages
This scheduler was better in comparison to the previously used very simple scheduler based on a circular queue.

Disadvantages 
If the number of processes is big, the scheduler may use a notable amount of the processor time itself. Picking the next task to run requires iteration through all currently planned tasks, so the scheduler runs in O(n) time, where n is the number of the planned processes.

See also

References 

Linux kernel process schedulers